Valarie McDermid,   (born 4 June 1955) is a Scottish crime writer, best known for a series of novels featuring clinical psychologist Dr. Tony Hill, in a grim sub-genre known as Tartan Noir.

Biography
McDermid comes from a working-class family in Fife. She studied English at St Hilda's College, Oxford, where she was the first student to be admitted from a Scottish state school.

After graduation she became a journalist and began her literary career as a dramatist. Her first success as a novelist, Report for Murder: The First Lindsay Gordon Mystery occurred in 1987.

McDermid was inducted into the prestigious Detection Club in 2000, and won the CWA Diamond Dagger for her lifetime contribution to crime writing in the English language in 2010.  She was awarded an honorary doctorate from the University of Sunderland in 2011. She is co-founder of the Harrogate Crime Writing Festival and the Theakston's Old Peculier Crime Novel of the Year Award, part of the Harrogate International Festivals. In 2016 she captained a team of St Hilda's alumnæ to win the Christmas University Challenge. In 2017, McDermid was elected a Fellow of the Royal Society of Edinburgh, as well as a Fellow of the Royal Society of Literature.

Work
McDermid's works fall into four series: Lindsay Gordon, Kate Brannigan, Tony Hill and Carol Jordan, and Inspector Karen Pirie. Her characters include a journalist, Lindsay Gordon; a private investigator, Kate Brannigan; a clinical psychologist, Tony Hill; and DCI Karen Pirie working out of Fife, Scotland. The Mermaids Singing, the first book in the Hill/Jordan series, won the Crime Writers' Association Gold Dagger for Best Crime Novel of the Year. The Hill/Jordan series has been adapted for television under the name Wire in the Blood, starring Robson Green.

McDermid has stated that Jacko Vance, a TV celebrity with a secret lust for torture, murder and under-age girls, who was featured in the Wire in the Blood and two later books, is based on her direct personal experience of interviewing Jimmy Savile. In 2010, McDermind received the Cartier Diamond Dagger from the Crime Writers' Association for "outstanding achievement in the field of crime writing".

McDermid considers her work to be part of the "Tartan Noir" Scottish crime fiction genre. In addition to writing novels, McDermid contributes to several British newspapers and often broadcasts on BBC Radio 4 and BBC Radio Scotland. Her novels, in particular the Tony Hill series, are known for their graphic depictions of violence and torture.

In August 2022 McDermid reported that the estate of Agatha Christie had threatened her publishers with legal action if they referred to McDermid as 'the Queen of Crime', stating that the term was copyrighted by the Christie estate.

Raith Rovers

McDermid was a lifelong fan of Raith Rovers football club, her father having worked as a scout for the club.  In 2010, she sponsored the McDermid Stand at Stark's Park, the club's ground in Kirkcaldy, in honour of her father.

A year after sponsoring the stand, she became a board member of the club, and starting in 2014 her website became Raith's shirt sponsor.

In February 2022, McDermid said she would be withdrawing her support and sponsorship from Raith Rovers after the club signed striker David Goodwillie, who had been ruled to have raped a woman and made to pay damages in a civil case in 2017. Following the signing of Goodwillie, Raith Rovers women’s team severed ties with the main club and renamed themselves McDermid Ladies, after the writer. McDermid moved her sponsorship to the new ladies' team.

Ink attack
On 6 December 2012 a woman poured ink over McDermid during an event at the University of Sunderland. McDermid was signing books, and a woman asked her to autograph a Top of the Pops annual which contained a picture of the disgraced late TV presenter Jimmy Savile. After McDermid reluctantly agreed the woman threw ink at her and ran out of the room. McDermid said the incident would not stop her from doing signings.

Northumbria Police arrested Sandra Botham, a 64-year-old woman from the Hendon area of Sunderland, on suspicion of assault. Botham was convicted of common assault on 10 July 2013, received a 12-month community order with supervision and was made to pay £50 compensation and a £60 victim surcharge. She was also given a restraining order forbidding her from contacting McDermid for an undefined period of time. The Northern Echo reported that Botham's actions were motivated by McDermid's 1994 non-fiction book, A Suitable Job for a Woman, as Botham claimed that the book contained a passage that besmirched her and her family.

Personal life
McDermid formerly lived in both Stockport and near Alnmouth in Northumberland with three cats and a border terrier dog. Since early 2014 she has lived in Stockport and Edinburgh.

In 2016, McDermid captained a team of crime writer challengers on the TV quiz Eggheads, beating the Eggheads and winning £14,000.

In 2010, she was still living between Northumberland and Manchester with publisher Kelly Smith, with whom she had entered into a civil partnership in 2006.

On 23 October 2016 McDermid married her partner of two years, Jo Sharp, a professor of geography at the University of Glasgow.

McDermid is a radical feminist and socialist. She has incorporated feminism into some of her novels.

Works

Lindsay Gordon series
Report for Murder (1987)
Common Murder (1989)
Final Edition (1991) US Titles: Open and Shut, Deadline for Murder
Union Jack (1993), US Title: Conferences Are Murder
Booked for Murder (1996)
Hostage to Murder (2003)

Kate Brannigan series
Dead Beat (1992)
Kick Back (1993)
Crack Down (1994)
Clean Break (1995)
Blue Genes (1996)
Star Struck (1998) (awarded Grand Prix des Romans d’Aventure in 1998)

Tony Hill and Carol Jordan series
The Mermaids Singing (1995) (Crime Writers' Association Gold Dagger for Best Crime Novel of the Year in 1995)
The Wire in the Blood (1997)
The Last Temptation (2002)
The Torment of Others (2004)
Beneath the Bleeding (2007)
Fever of the Bone (2009)
The Retribution (2011)
Cross and Burn (2013)
Splinter the Silence (2015)
Insidious Intent (2017)
How the Dead Speak (2019)

Inspector Karen Pirie series
The Distant Echo (2003)
A Darker Domain (2008)
The Skeleton Road (2014)
Out of Bounds (2016)
Broken Ground (2018)
Still Life (2020)

Allie Burns series
1979 (2021)
1989 (2022)

The Austen Project
Northanger Abbey (2014)

Other books
The Writing on the Wall (1997); short stories, limited edition of 200 copies
A Place of Execution (1999)
Killing the Shadows (2000)
Stranded (2005); short stories
Cleanskin (2006)
The Grave Tattoo (2006)
Trick of the Dark (2010) dedicated to Mary Bennett (1913-2003) & Kathy Vaughan Wilkes (1946-2003)
The Vanishing Point (2012)
 Resistance: A Graphic Novel (2021), illustrated by Kathryn Briggs (Profile Books/Wellcome Collection, London)
 The Second Murder at the Vicarage in Marple, Twelve New Mysteries (2022) p.33-52, (HarperCollins, New York)

Children's books
My Granny is a Pirate (2012)
The High Heid Yin's New Claes, published in The Itchy Coo Book o Hans Christian Andersen Fairy Tales in Scots (2020)

Non-fiction
A Suitable Job for a Woman (HarperCollins, 1994)
Forensics – The Anatomy of Crime (Profile Books & Wellcome Collection, 2014)
 Published in the United States under the title Forensics: What Bugs, Burns, Prints, DNA, and More Tell Us About Crime (Black Cat, 2015)
My Scotland (Little, Brown, 2019)
Imagine a Country (Little, Brown, 2020)

References

External links
 
 
 Val McDermid talks about the novels that have influenced her in the Guardian bookshop challenge, 7 June 2010.
 Jane Graham, Val McDermid: "There were no lesbians in Fife in the 1960s", The Big Issue, 7 February 2018.

1955 births
Living people
People from Kirkcaldy
People educated at Kirkcaldy High School
Alumni of St Hilda's College, Oxford
Scottish crime fiction writers
Scottish mystery writers
Scottish women novelists
Scottish lesbian writers
Members of the Detection Club
Lambda Literary Award winners
Anthony Award winners
Macavity Award winners
Barry Award winners
Dilys Award winners
Radical feminists
Scottish socialists
Women mystery writers
Scottish LGBT novelists
20th-century Scottish novelists
21st-century Scottish novelists
20th-century Scottish women writers
21st-century Scottish women writers
Fellows of the Royal Society of Edinburgh
Fellows of the Royal Society of Literature
Tartan Noir writers
People from Alnmouth
Cartier Diamond Dagger winners